Hypocrita albimacula is a moth of the family Erebidae. It was described by Herbert Druce in 1897. It is found in Costa Rica, Belize and Guatemala.

References

 

Hypocrita
Moths described in 1897